Stéphane Roux is a French voice actor and animator for Disney. He has provided the voice of the cooking channel narrator in the English version of Ratatouille, among other voice talents.

Filmography
 Rabbids Go Home (2009 Video Game) (voice) aka The lapins crétins - La grosse aventure (France) 
 Sagan (2008) .... Le vendeur à la librairie 
 Versailles, le rêve d'un roi (2008 TV series) .... Charles Perrault 
 Ratatouille (2007) (voice) .... Narrator 
 Paris enquêtes criminelles (2007 TV series) .... Gautier Lamarre (aka "Law & Order: Paris") 
 Africa Paradis (2006) .... Olivier Morel 
 Monster Allergy (2006 TV series) (Storyboard Artist) 
 Arthur and the Invisibles (2006 film) (Storyboard Artist) aka Arthur et les Minimoys (France) 
 Kingdom Hearts II (2005 Video Game) .... Xigbar 
 Gadget and the Gadgetinis (2003 TV series) (Assistant Director and Storyboard Supervisor) 
 Michel Audiard et le mystère du triangle des Bermudes (2002) (Writer and Director) 
 Fantômette (2000 TV cartoon) (Director) 
 Mot (1996 TV series) (Layout Artist) 
 La Grande Chasse de Nanook (1996 TV series) (Director) 
 Space Strikers (1995 TV series) (Background Modeler) 
 A Goofy Movie (1995) (Layout Artist) 
 Les aphrorécits (1992) 
 Cyrano de Bergerac (1990) 
 Valmont (1989) (Production Assistant)

Notes

External links
 

French male voice actors
French animators
French storyboard artists
Year of birth missing (living people)
Living people